The Malta men's national under-18 basketball team is a national basketball team of Malta, administered by the Malta Basketball Association. It represents the country in international men's under-18 basketball competitions.

The team won two medals at the FIBA U18 European Championship Division C.

FIBA U18 European Championship participations

See also
Malta men's national basketball team
Malta men's national under-16 basketball team
Malta women's national under-18 basketball team

References

External links
Archived records of Malta team participations

Basketball in Malta
Basketball
Men's national under-18 basketball teams